The Rockchip RK3288 is an ARM architecture System on Chip (SoC) from Rockchip. It is the first SoC, in August 2014, that uses the 32-bit ARM Cortex-A17 processor. It is a quad-core processor with a NEON coprocessor and hardware acceleration for video and 3D graphics. It is used in a number of Chromebooks and other low-power, low-performance devices.

Specifications 
 28 nm HKMG process.
 Quad-core ARM Cortex-A17, up to 1.8 GHz
 Quad-core ARM Mali-T760 MP4 GPU clocked at 650 MHz supporting OpenGL ES 1.1/2.0/3.0/3.1, OpenCL 1.1, Renderscript and Direct3D 11.1
 High performance dedicated 2D processor
 1080P video encoding for H.264 and VP8, MVC
 4K H.264 and 10bits H.265 video decode, 1080P multi video decode
 Supports 4Kx2K H.265 resolution
 Dual-channel 64-bit DRAM controller supporting DDR3, DDR3L, LPDDR2 and LPDDR3
 Up to 3840x2160 display output, HDMI 2.0
 Support dual-channel LVDS/dual-channel MIPI-DSI/eDP1.1 
 HW Security system, support HDCP 2.X
 Embedded 13M ISP and MIPI-CSI2 interface

Related products 

The RK3288-C is used in the "Veyron" board design of several Chromebooks, and powers all of the following devices:
GPD - GPD XD (handheld console)
 Hisense Chromebook 11
 Haier Chromebook 11 (and "edu" variant)
 AKAI MPC & FORCE
 DENON DJ SC, Live & Prime Units 
 AOPEN Chromebox Mini ME4100
 ASUS C201 Chromebook
 ASUS Chromebook Flip C100
 ASUS Chromebook Flip C100P
 ASUS Chromebook Flip C100PA
 ASUS Chromebit
 ASUS Tinker Board and ASUS Tinker Board S
 Boardcon EM3288 SBC, MINI3288 module
 Radxa Rock 2 - System on Module type single board computer based on RK3288
 Lenovo miniStation (game console)
 Rikomagik MK902II (Android), MK902II LE (Linux) (netbox)
 Rikomagik MK802 V5 (Android), MK802 V5 LE (Linux) (Stick PC)
 AtGames Legends Ultimate Arcade Cabinet 
 Mqmaker - MiQi SBC (Linux, Android)
Headrush MX5 (guitar multi-FX unit)

References

ARM-based systems on chips